Sisuarissut Strait is a strait between Sisuarissut Island and Puugutaa Island in the Upernavik Archipelago of Greenland.

Straits of the Upernavik Archipelago